Lynn H. Becklin (born September 1, 1932) was an American politician.

Becklin was born in Cambridge, Isanti County, Minnesota and graduated from Cambridge High School. He served in the United States Air Force, during the Vietnam War, and was commissioned a lieutenant colonel. Becklin received his bachelor's degree from the University of Minnesota School of Management. He served in the Minnesota House of Representatives in 1973 and 1974 and in 1985 and 1986. Becklin was a Republican.

References

1932 births
Living people
People from Cambridge, Minnesota
Military personnel from Minnesota
University of Minnesota alumni
Republican Party members of the Minnesota House of Representatives